Abhinavamritha (Sanskrit:अभिनवामृता); (also spelled Abhinavamrutha), is a Sanskrit work on Dvaita philosophy written by Satyanatha Tirtha. It is a lucid adaptation of the well-known commentary on Pramāṇa-Paddhatī of Jayatirtha, which is an independent work on the epistemological aspects (Pramana) of Dvaita. It runs to 1,400 granthas. It follows the commentary of Srinivasa Tirtha in the main, which it nevertheless criticizes on occasions.

References

Bibliography
 

Dvaita Vedanta
Philosophical literature
Sanskrit texts